Pang Weiguo (born 28 September 1972) is a Chinese former professional snooker player.

References 

1972 births
Living people
Chinese snooker players
Asian Games medalists in cue sports
Cue sports players at the 1998 Asian Games
Cue sports players at the 2002 Asian Games
Medalists at the 2002 Asian Games
Asian Games silver medalists for China
21st-century Chinese people